Duif ("dove, pigeon") is an archaic Dutch male given name and patronymic surname. Variant spellings include Duijf, Duyf and Duive. Female forms are Duifje, Duifke, Duijfie, etc., some of which are still in use.

 Jan Ariens Duif (1617-1649), a Dutch Golden Age painter from Gouda
 Tjeertje Bergers-Duif (born 1944), a Dutch sprint canoer
Duyff
  (1907–1969), Dutch WWII resistance fighter

References

See also 

 De Duif, a church on the Prinsengracht in Amsterdam
 Daub
 Douwe, West-Frisian given name of the same origin

Dutch-language surnames
Dutch masculine given names
Patronymic surnames